Ivica Ivušić (born 1 February 1995) is a Croatian professional footballer who plays as a goalkeeper for Pafos FC.

Club career
Born in Rijeka, Ivušić started his youth career with local club Rijeka. He spent eight years with the academy before signing for Internazionale academy in 2009. In July 2014, he was loaned off to Lega Pro club Prato. On 30 August 2014, he made his debut against San Marino Calcio. He later joined Prva HNL side Istra 1961 on 17 August 2015.
On 18 January 2018, Greek club Olympiacos announced the signing of Ivušić for an undisclosed fee.

On 12 June 2018, Ivušić returned to Croatia and joined NK Osijek on a four-year contract.

International career
On 17 May 2021, Ivušić was named in the preliminary 34-man squad for the UEFA Euro 2020, but did not make the final 26. He made his debut for the Croatia national team on 4 September 2021 in a World Cup qualifier against Slovakia, keeping a clean sheet in a 1–0 away victory.

On 9 November 2022, Ivušić was named in Zlatko Dalić's 26-man squad for the 2022 FIFA World Cup, where he remained an unused substitute as Croatia finished third.

Career statistics

Club

International

Honours
Croatia
FIFA World Cup third place: 2022

References

External links
 
 

1995 births
Living people
Footballers from Rijeka
Croatian footballers
Croatian expatriate footballers
Association football goalkeepers
Inter Milan players
A.C. Prato players
NK Istra 1961 players
Olympiacos F.C. players
NK Osijek players
Serie C players
Croatian Football League players
2022 FIFA World Cup players
Croatia youth international footballers
Croatia international footballers
Expatriate footballers in Italy
Croatian expatriate sportspeople in Italy
Expatriate footballers in Greece
Croatian expatriate sportspeople in Greece